A by-election was held for the New South Wales Legislative Assembly electorate of Bingara on 10 June 1916 because George McDonald resigned from the party and his seat as a protest at the behaviour of the Easter 1916 NSW Labor conference and recontested the seat as an Independent.

Results

George McDonald had been elected as a  member in the 1913 election. He resigned from the party and his seat as a protest at the behaviour of the Easter 1916 NSW Labor conference and retained the seat at the by-election as an Independent.

See also
Electoral results for the district of Bingara
List of New South Wales state by-elections

Notes

References

1916 elections in Australia
New South Wales state by-elections
1910s in New South Wales